Chuprino is a rural locality (a village) in Kaduy Urban Settlement, Kaduysky District, Vologda Oblast, Russia. The population was 75 as of 2002.

Geography 
Chuprino is located 3 km southwest of Kaduy (the district's administrative centre) by road. Kaduy is the nearest rural locality.

References 

Rural localities in Kaduysky District